The Wasp SP Mk2 is a British powered hang glider that was designed and produced by Wasp Systems (now called Wasp Flight Systems) of Crook, Cumbria. Now out of production, when it was available the aircraft was supplied complete and ready-to-fly.

The SP Mk2 was introduced at Telford in 2002, following a 12-month development schedule.

Design and development
The SP Mk2 features a cable-braced hang glider-style high-wing, weight-shift controls, single-place accommodation, foot-launching and landing and a single engine in pusher configuration.

The aircraft uses a standard hang glider wing, made from bolted-together aluminum tubing, with its single surface wing covered in Dacron sailcloth. The wing is supported by a single tube-type kingpost and uses an "A" frame control bar. The engine is a two-stroke, single cylinder Radne Raket 120 of  that mounts a tuned exhaust, controlled by a foot pedal. Electric starting is provided via a 12-cell Nickel–metal hydride battery. The harness mounts the engine and the  fuel tank. Each harness was custom made for the individual pilot to provide an exact fit and improve comfort. The harness incorporates a shaped carbon backplate, with a  foam insert, neoprene shoulder inserts, an adjustable prone angle and a multi-setting rotation point. Dual retractable cable-braced skids are provided to protect the two, or optionally three-bladed propeller, during take-off and landing.

Specifications (SP Mk2)

References

Mk2
2000s British ultralight aircraft
Single-engined pusher aircraft
Powered hang gliders